Donald Leroy Warnke (April 8, 1920 – April 14, 1970) was an American professional basketball player as well as college basketball and baseball coach. He played for the Cleveland Allmen Transfers and Youngstown Bears in the National Basketball League and averaged 1.4 points per game.

Warnke played basketball, but not baseball, at Valparaiso University. He later became the head coach for both programs. He guided the baseball team from 1946 through 1953, while he led the basketball team during the 1948–49 season. His overall baseball record was 71–54, while his overall basketball record was 8–17.

References

1920 births
1970 deaths
American men's basketball players
Basketball coaches from Indiana
Basketball players from Indiana
Centers (basketball)
Cleveland Allmen Transfers players
People from Flagstaff, Arizona
People from Michigan City, Indiana
Valparaiso Beacons baseball coaches
Valparaiso Beacons men's basketball coaches
Valparaiso Beacons men's basketball players
Youngstown Bears players